Asuroides similis is a moth of the family Erebidae. It was described by Antonio Durante in 2008. It is found in Africa.

References

Moths described in 2008
Nudariina
Moths of Africa